Lower East Pubnico (La Field) Airport  is located  northeast of Lower East Pubnico, Nova Scotia, Canada.

References

Registered aerodromes in Nova Scotia
Transport in Yarmouth County
Buildings and structures in Yarmouth County